The Olaf Stordahl Barn, in Kingsbury County, South Dakota near Arlington, was built in 1918.  It was listed on the National Register of Historic Places in 2002.

It is a Wisconsin Dairy Barn.  It is a  barn built of brown, glazed clay hollow-tile bricks on its first floor.  It has a concrete foundation and a gambrel roof.  A concrete stave silo is attached.

References

National Register of Historic Places in South Dakota
Buildings and structures completed in 1918
Kingsbury County, South Dakota
Barns in South Dakota
Wisconsin dairy barns